The Humanitas Programme is a series of Visiting Professorships at the Universities of Oxford and Cambridge in England, intended to bring leading practitioners and scholars to both universities to address major themes in the arts, social sciences, and humanities.

Appointed for a given academic year, each Humanitas Visiting Professor delivers a series of events ranging from lectures to workshops, masterclasses, recitals and symposia.  Lectures and symposia are filmed and available online to audiences throughout the world 

Created by Lord Weidenfeld in 2010, the Humanitas Programme is funded by a number of donors and managed by the Oxford-based Weidenfeld-Hoffmann Trust. The Humanitas Programme has also been run in collaboration with TORCH The Oxford Research Centre in the Humanities and CRASSH Centre for Research in the Arts, Social Sciences and Humanities

The Humanitas Programme often draws media attention for its topical and high-profile speakers, such as Eric Schmidt sharing a positive outlook on the impact of new technologies on our world, or Murray Perahia exploring the personal and universal in the work musical genius, or Shirin Neshat discussing the formation of her artistic identity.

Its Visiting Professorships have touched upon topics ranging from the complexity of narrating history to the challenges of sustainable development in the 21st century.

List of Humanitas Visiting Professorships 

Visiting Professorship in Architecture University of Oxford, Brasenose College

 2010-2011: Lord Foster (architect), How do we sustainably accommodate even larger populations in cities in a way that does not recklessly deplete natural resources?
 2011-2012: Lord Foster (architect), Heritage and Lessons

Visiting Professorship in Chamber Music University of Cambridge, Peterhouse

 2010-2011: Alfred Brendel (pianist), On Character in Music and Light and Shade of Interpretation
 2012-2013: Robert Levin (Harvard), Encountering Mozart
 2013-2014: Angela Hewitt, The Art of Fugue
 2014-2015: Murray Perahia, On Performing the Classics
 2015-2016: Mitsuko Uchida,

Visiting Professorship in Chinese Studies University of Cambridge, St Catharine's College

 2011-2012: Professor Wu Hung (University of Chicago), Reading Absence in Chinese Art and Material Culture
 2012-2013: Chen Yung-fa, The Meaning of the Chinese Communist Revolution
 2013-2014: David Wang, What is Chinese about Chinese Literature?
 2014-2015: Xu Bing, The Reactivation of TraditionVisiting Professorship in Classical Music and Musical Education University of Oxford, St John's College 2012-2013: Imogen Cooper (pianist), Schubert 2013-2014: Midori (violinist and educator), Bach, Brahms, Music Education and Community Engagement 2014-2015: Ian Bostridge Why Winterreise? Schubert's song cycle, then and now
 2015-2016:Sérgio and Odair Assad

Visiting Professorship in Comparative European Literature University of Oxford, St Anne's College

 2010-2011: James Wood (Harvard),  Everything, Nothing, Something; 'Melville and the New Atheists; Jens Peter Jacobsen and the contradictions of atheism; 'Tolstoy's Third Way Lecture; An answer vouchsafed them: Virginia Woolf's mystic God; Beckett and Nothing, online
 2011-2012: Ali Smith (author), On Time, On Form, On Edge, On Offer, and On Reflection
 2013-2013: Don Paterson The Domain of the Poem
 2014-2015: Javier Cercas The Blind Spot

Visiting Professorship in Contemporary Art (including photography) University of Oxford, Magdalen College

 2010-2011: Thomas Struth (photographer), Do pictures contribute to identity and cultural difference?
 2011-2012: Shirin Neshat (artist and filmmaker), Images and History
2012-2013: William Kentridge (artist), Thinking On One's Feet
 2013-2014: Vik Muniz Class Dismissed . . . Art, Creativity and Education
 2014-2015: Maya Lin Between Art and Architecture

Visiting Professorship in Drama University of Oxford, Brasenose College

 2010-2011: Athol Fugard (playwright), The Playwriting Process and Theatrical Directing
 2011-2012: Vanessa Redgrave (actress), Theatre and Politics Today
 2012-2013: Gregory Doran (Artistic Director of the Royal Shakespeare Company)
 2014-2015: David Edgar Plays Today

Visiting Professorship in Economic Thought University of Oxford, All Souls College

 2011-2012: Sir Partha Dasgupta (Cambridge), Time and the Generations
 2012-2013: Stanley Fischer (Governor of the Bank of Israel), Lessons of the Crisis
 2013-2014: Roger Myerson (Nobel laureate, University of Chicago), Political Economy and Economic Development

Visiting Professorship in Film & Television University of Oxford, St Anne's College

 2012-2013: Michael Winterbottom (film director), Genre, Adaptation, and Contemporary Cinema
 2013-2014: Kelly Reichardt American Landscapes and Narratives of the Road
 2016-2017: Lenny Abrahamson The Uncertain Filmmaker
 2017-2018: Sam Mendes

Visiting Professorship in Historiography University of Oxford, Trinity College

 2011-2012: Saul Friedländer (UCLA), Trends in the Historiography of the Holocaust
 2012-2013: Christopher Bayly (University of Cambridge), Worlds of Thought: Empire, India and Islam
 2013-2014: Lynn Hunt Dilemmas of History in a Global Age
 2014-2015: Barbara Rosenwein The History of Emotions
 2015-2016: Simon Schama, the Past and its Publics

Visiting Professorship in the History of Art University of Cambridge, Clare College

 2012-2013: Philippe de Montebello (former Director of the Metropolitan Museum of Art, New York), The Multiple Lives of the Work of Art
 2013-2014: Pierre Rosenberg (former Director of the Louvre), Poussin in England
 2015-2016: Wim Pijbes (Director of the Rijksmuseum, Amsterdam), Old Masters Fit for the Future

Visiting Professorship in the History of Ideas University of Oxford, Merton College

 2012-2013: Lorraine Daston (Executive Director of the Max Planck Institute, Berlin), Nature's Revenge: A History of Risk, Responsibility, and Reasonableness
2016-2017: Jared Diamond (Professor of Geography at the University of California, Los Angeles), The Use of Religion

Visiting Professorship in Intelligence Studies University of Oxford, All Souls College

 2013-2014: General Hayden (Former Director of the Central Intelligence Agency), Terrorism and Islam's Civil War
 2014-2015: John McLaughlin (Former Deputy Director of the Central Intelligence Agency), Challenges Facing American Intelligence

Visiting Professorship in Interfaith Studies University of Oxford, Lady Margaret Hall

 2010-2012: Jan Assmann (University of Konstanz), Ancient Egyptian Religion
 2011-2012: Lord Sacks (Chief Rabbi of the United Hebrew Congregations of the Commonwealth), A Jewish Theology of the Other
 2012-2013: Abdou Filali-Ansary (Aga Khan University, London), Beyond Apologetics: Approaching Religious Traditions Through Modern Disciplines
 2013-2014: Rowan Williams, Faith and Power

Visiting Professorship in Media University of Cambridge, St John's College

 2010-2011: Mathias Döpfner (CEO of Axel Springer AG), ‘The Freedom Trap’, ‘The Internet – a Liberating or Enslaving Machine?’ and ‘Can Journalism be Free in the Digital Age?' 
 2011-2012: Manuel Castells (UCLA), Communication Power in the Network Society
 2012-2013: Eric Schmidt (Executive Chairman of Google), Our Connected Age
 2013-2014: Alastair Campbell (former Director of Communications and Strategy to Prime Minister Tony Blair), A Life at the Nexus of Media and Politics
 2014-2015: Emily Bell, (Director of the Tow Center for Digital Journalism, Columbia University), The Impact of Social  Media and the Internet on Journalism and News Publishing

Visiting Professorship in Museums, Galleries, and Libraries University of Oxford, Balliol College

 2010-2011: Glen D. Lowry (Director of the Museum of Modern Art, New York), The Abodes of the Muses: Theorising the Modern Art Museum
 2011-2012: Malcolm Rogers (Director of the Museum of Fine Arts, Boston), The Art Museum in the 21st Century
2012-2013: Ivo Mesquita (State Art Gallery of Sao Paulo), Contemporary Art and Globalisation
 2013-2014: Michael Govan, A Voice from the Pacific: Re-envisioning the Art Museum
 2014-2015: Stephen Greenblatt, The Humanities are they important?

Visiting Professorship in Opera Studies University of Oxford, New College

 2011-2012: Joseph Volpe (General Manager of the Metropolitan Opera, 1990-2006), Whither Opera in the 21st Century?
 2012-2013: Gerard Mortier (Director of Teatro Real de Madrid)
 2013-2014: Renee Fleming (Soprano)
 2015-2016: Christian Thielemann (Chief Conductor of the Staatskapelle Dresden)
 2016-2017: William Christie (Director of Les Arts Florissants)

Visiting Professorship in Rhetoric and the Art of Public Persuasion University of Oxford, St Peter's College

 2012-2013: Mark Thompson (former Director General of the BBC, CEO of The New York Times Company), The Cloud of Unknowing

Visiting Professorship in Statecraft and Diplomacy University of Cambridge, Pembroke College

 2011-2012: Helen Clark (Administrator of the United Nations Development Programme; Chair of the United Nations Development Group; former Prime Minister of New Zealand), Development in the 21st Century
 2012-2013: Gareth Evans (former Foreign Minister of Australia), In Defence of Optimism
 2014-2015: Richard Haass World Order: Its Past, Present & Prospects
 2015-2016: Martti Ahtisaari Preventing Conflicts and Building Fairer Societies

Visiting Professorship in Sustainability Studies University of Cambridge, Trinity Hall

 2013-2014: Gretchen Daily (Stanford University), Nature's Competing Values
 2014-2015: Johan Rockstrom, Human Prosperity within Planetary Boundaries
 2015-2016  Paul Ferraro, Environmental Problems are Human Problems
 2018-2019: Pamela Matson, The Tellus Mater Distinguished Fellowship’
 2019-2020: Ruth de Fries, The Tellus Mater Distinguished Fellowship’

Visiting Professorship in Voice and Classical Music University of Oxford, New College

 2014-2015: Sir John Tomlinson (Bass)
 2017-2018: Andreas Scholl (Countertenor)
 2019-2020: James Conlon (Richard Seaver Music Director, LA Opera)

Visiting Professorship in War Studies University of Cambridge, Churchill College

 2010-2011: Hew Strachan (Oxford), Modern War and the Question of History
 2011-2012: Jay Winter (Yale University), Imagining War in the 20th Century and After
 2012-2013: Martin van Creveld (Military historian and theorist), The Future of War

Visiting Professorship in Women's Rights University of Cambridge, King's College

 2010-2011: Nancy Fraser (The New School), Women's Rights in the 21st Century
 2011-2012: Baroness Kennedy QC (Principal, Mansfield College), The Illusion of Inclusion: Women and the Law
 2012-2013: Melanne Verveer (United States Ambassador-at-Large for Global Women's Issues), Gender Equality: A Moral and Foreign Policy Imperative
 2013-2014: Mona Siddiqui, Women in Islamic Thought and Literature
 2014-2015: Natasha Walter, From Sexism to Solidarity

References

External links
 Official Humanitas web page
 Humanitas at Oxford
 Humanitas at Cambridge
 Institute for Strategic Dialogue

2010 establishments in England
Awards and prizes of the University of Oxford
Awards and prizes of the University of Cambridge
Oxbridge
Awards established in 2010
Professorships at the University of Cambridge
Professorships at the University of Oxford
School of Arts and Humanities, University of Cambridge